Edmund Rowe (December 21, 1892 – October 4, 1972) was an American businessman and politician who served one term as a U.S. Representative from Ohio from 1943 to 1945.

Biography 
Born in Sherrodsville, Ohio, Rowe attended the public schools.
He worked in the coal mines 1905–1909, in the rubber industry 1909–1913, and at the machinist trade 1913–1916.
During the First World War served in the United States Navy from 1917 to 1919.
He was owner of a bowling academy 1919–1929.
He engaged in the real estate business in 1920 and the insurance business in 1928.
Organizer of the Rowe Oil & Chemical Co. in 1936.
He served as member of the city council of Akron, Ohio from 1928 to 1942, serving one term as president.

Congress 
Rowe was elected as a Republican to the Seventy-eighth Congress (January 3, 1943 – January 3, 1945).
He was an unsuccessful candidate for reelection in 1944 to the Seventy-ninth Congress and for election in 1948 to the Eighty-first Congress.
He served as member of the Ohio General Assembly 1955–1959.
He was an unsuccessful candidate for mayor of Akron in 1957.
Real estate broker.

Death 
Resided in Akron, Ohio, where he died October 4, 1972.
He was interred in Glendale Cemetery.

Sources

1892 births
1972 deaths
People from Carroll County, Ohio
Politicians from Akron, Ohio
United States Navy sailors
United States Navy personnel of World War I
Republican Party members of the Ohio House of Representatives
20th-century American politicians
Republican Party members of the United States House of Representatives from Ohio